Emely Brigitte Obregón (born 12 September 2001) is an American-born Nicaraguan footballer who plays as a midfielder for college team Colorado Mesa Mavericks the Nicaragua women's national team.

Early life
Obergón was raised in Fontana, California.

High school and college career
Obergón has attended the Fontana High School in her hometown and the Colorado Mesa University in Grand Junction, Colorado.

International career
Obregón represented Nicaragua at the 2020 CONCACAF Women's U-20 Championship. She made her senior debut during the 2020 CONCACAF Women's Olympic Qualifying Championship qualification.

References 

2001 births
Living people
People with acquired Nicaraguan citizenship
Nicaraguan women's footballers
Women's association football midfielders
Nicaragua women's international footballers
People from Fontana, California
Sportspeople from San Bernardino County, California
Soccer players from California
American women's soccer players
Colorado Mesa Mavericks women's soccer players
College women's soccer players in the United States
American people of Nicaraguan descent